Ciuta may refer to

Places
 Several villages in Romania, including:
 Ciuta, a village in Măgura, Buzău
 Ciuta, a village in Obreja Commune, Caraş-Severin County
 Ciuta, a village in Bicaz Commune, Maramureș County

Agriculture
 The Ciuta (sheep), a domestic sheep breed from Lombardy, in northern Italy

Plays
 Ciuta (play), a play by Victor Ion Popa